In remote sensing, ground sample distance (GSD) in a digital photo (such as an orthophoto) of the ground from air or space is the distance between pixel centers measured on the ground. For example, in an image with a one-meter GSD, adjacent pixels image locations are 1 meter apart on the ground.  GSD is a measure of one limitation to spatial resolution or image resolution, that is, the limitation due to sampling.

GSD is also referred to as ground-projected sample interval (GSI) or ground-projected instantaneous field of view (GIFOV).

See also 
 Geographic distance

References 

Aerial photography
Photogrammetry
Satellite imagery